WCVO  is a radio station in Gahanna, Ohio, United States located at 104.9 MHz broadcasting family-friendly Christian music as "104.9 the River" in Central Ohio.  Previously operated by Christian Voice of Central Ohio until 2012, the parent company changed its name to One Connection Media Group.  104.9 the River's slogan is "Uplifting and Encouraging".

In April 2016, the Ohio Supreme Court determined that WCVO-FM is considered a place of "public worship" and therefore exempt from property taxes, overturning an earlier decision by Ohio tax commissioner Joseph Testa.

WCVO broadcasts in the HD Radio format.

References

External links
Official website

Contemporary Christian radio stations in the United States
CVO
Gahanna, Ohio
Radio stations established in 1972
1972 establishments in Ohio
CVO